The Fayetteville Crossover are a semi-professional basketball team based in Fayetteville, North Carolina. Home games are played at the John D. Fuller, Sr. Recrerational/Athletic Complex.

History
The team began play in 2011 as a member of the Continental Basketball League. On May 15, 2011 Fayetteville won their first game in team history, defeating the Wilmington Sea Dawgs 107-99.

In November 2011 the team joined the new Tobacco Road Basketball League. Fayetteville played three seasons in the TRBL, going 14-21 overall.

In July 2014 it was announced that the Crossover would be the fifth member of the new East Coast Basketball League.

Season-By-Season records

References

External links
 Official website
 @Fay_Crossover

Basketball teams in North Carolina
Sports in Fayetteville, North Carolina
Former Continental Basketball League teams
Basketball teams established in 2011
2011 establishments in North Carolina